The name Warling has been used to name four tropical cyclones in the Philippines by PAGASA in the Western Pacific.

 Typhoon Agnes (1971) (T7126, Warling)
 Typhoon Tip (1979) (T7919, Warling), most intense tropical cyclone ever recorded.
 Typhoon Orchid (1983) (T8320, Warling), killed 3 people in the Philippines and capsized a vessel, killing 167 more people.
 Typhoon Seth (1991) (26W, Warling)

Pacific typhoon set index articles